Crinolamia edwardiensis is a species of sea snail, a marine gastropod mollusk in the family Eulimidae. This was the first species to receive a taxonomic authority within the genus, Crinolamia, by Watson in 1880.

References

External links
 To World Register of Marine Species

Eulimidae
Gastropods described in 1880